Skeeter Thurston is an American-Canadian former professional rodeo cowboy who specialized in saddle bronc riding.

Rodeo career
He was a six-time qualifier for the National Finals Rodeo.  He was also a five-time qualifier for the Canadian Finals Rodeo.

Personal life
He is the father of world champion Zeke Thurston.  He is originally is from Hyannis, Nebraska, United States and currently resides in Big Valley, Alberta, Canada.

References

Living people
Saddle bronc riders
People from Grant County, Nebraska
Sportspeople from Alberta
Year of birth missing (living people)